Frida Esparza (born 17 January 2001) is a Mexican-American artistic gymnast who represented Mexico at the 2018 and 2019 World Championships. Esparza was part of the Mexican team that won the bronze medal at the 2018 Pan American Championships. She is currently a member of the UCLA Bruins women's gymnastics team.

Personal life
Esparza was born in Concord, California to Mexican parents. Her parents enrolled her in gymnastics when she was two years old.

Esparza holds dual citizenship for Mexico and the United States. She competed at the 2016 and 2017 U.S. Championships, but began representing Mexico in 2018.

Career
In 2018, Esparza became the Mexican national all-around champion, also taking the gold on the uneven bars and the silver on the balance beam. She was selected to the Mexican team for the 2018 Pan American Championships alongside Paulina Campos, Alexa Moreno, Nicolle Castro and Natalia Escalera. They took the bronze medal in the team final behind the United States and Brazil. Individually, Esparza placed ninth in the all-around final. Esparza also competed at the 2018 World Championships in Doha, Qatar, where she placed 32nd in the individual all-around and 19th with the Mexican team.

In 2019, Esparza won the gold medal in the uneven bars final at the Guimarães World Challenge Cup in Portugal. At the 2019 World Championships in Stuttgart, Germany she placed 21st with the Mexican team during qualifications.

Esparza joined the UCLA Bruins women's gymnastics team as a freshman for the 2020-21 season. At the 2021 PAC-12 Championships, she contributed to the team’s third place finish and placed fourth on the uneven bars individually.

Competitive history

References

External links

2001 births
Living people
Mexican female artistic gymnasts
UCLA Bruins women's gymnasts
People from Concord, California
21st-century Mexican women
21st-century American women